List of constants may refer to:
 List of mathematical constants
 List of physical constants